The last Bulgarian royal family is a line of the Koháry branch of the House of Saxe-Coburg and Gotha, which ruled Bulgaria from 1887 to 1946. The last tsar, Simeon II, became Prime Minister of Bulgaria in 2001 and remained in office until 2005. Members of the royal family hold the titles of Prince (Princess) of Bulgaria and Duke (Duchess) in Saxony, with the style of Royal Highness.

Coburg Peak on Trinity Peninsula in Antarctica is named after the Bulgarian royal house of Saxe-Coburg and Gotha.

Members of the royal family
The Bulgarian royal family includes:

 Tsar Simeon II and Tsaritsa Margarita (the Tsar and his wife)
 Miriam, Dowager Princess of Tarnovo (the widow of the Tsar's first son)
Boris, Prince of Turnovo (the Tsar's grandson and heir apparent)
 Prince Beltran (the Tsar's grandson)
 Kyril, Prince of Preslav and Rosario, Princess of Preslav (the Tsar's son and daughter-in-law)
 Princess Mafalda, Mrs. Abousleiman (the Tsar's granddaughter)
 Princess Olimpia (the Tsar's granddaughter)
 Prince Tassilo (the Tsar's grandson)
 Kubrat, Prince of Panagiurishte and Carla, Princess of Panagiurishte (the Tsar's son and daughter-in-law)
 Prince Mirko (the Tsar's grandson)
 Prince Lukás (the Tsar's grandson)
 Prince Tirso (the Tsar's grandson)
 Konstantin-Assen, Prince of Vidin and Maria, Princess of Vidin (the Tsar's son and daughter-in-law)
  (the Tsar's grandson)
 Princess Sofia (the Tsar's granddaughter)
 Princess Kalina, Mrs. Muñoz (the Tsar's daughter)
 Marie Louise, Princess of Koháry (the Tsar's sister)

Members of the extended family
The Tsar's extended family includes:

 Marc Abousleiman (the Tsar's grandson-in-law, husband of Princess Mafalda)
 Antonio Muñoz (the Tsar's son-in-law, husband of Princess Kalina) 
 Simeon-Hassan Muñoz (the Tsar's grandson)
 Bronislaw Chrobok (the Tsar's brother-in-law, second husband of the Princess of Koháry)
 Prince Boris and Princess Cheryl of Leiningen (the Tsar's nephew and niece-in-law)
 Prince Nicholas of Leiningen (the Tsar's grandnephew)
 Prince Karl Heinrich of Leiningen (the Tsar's grandnephew)
 Princess Juliana of Leiningen (the Tsar's grandniece)
 Prince Hermann Friedrich and Princess Deborah of Leiningen (the Tsar's nephew and niece-in-law)
 Princess Tatiana, Mrs. Reynolds and Clayton Reynolds (the Tsar's grandniece and grandnephew-in-law)
 August Reynolds (the Tsar's great-grandnephew)
 Princess Nadia, Mrs. Baker and Ian Baker (the Tsar's grandniece and grandnephew-in-law)
 Thomas Baker (the Tsar's great-grandnephew)
 Princess Alexandra of Leiningen (the Tsar's grandniece)
 Princess Alexandra, Mrs. Raposo de Magalhães and Jorge Raposo de Magalhães (the Tsar's niece and nephew-in-law)
 Luis Raposo de Magalhães (the Tsar's grandnephew)
 Giovanna Raposo de Magalhães (the Tsar's grandniece)
 Clementine Raposo de Magalhães (the Tsar's grandniece)
 Prince Pawel and Princess Ariana Chrobok of Koháry (the Tsar nephew and niece-in-law)
 Princess Maya Chrobok of Koháry (the Tsar's grandniece)
 Prince Alexander Ferdinand Chrobok of Koháry (the Tsar's grandnephew)
Duke Alexander Eugen of Württemberg (the Tsar's cousin, son of Princess Nadezhda)
Duchess Sophie of Württemberg (the Tsar's cousin, daughter of Princess Nadezhda)
Duke Boris of Sredets (the Tsar's first cousin, twice removed)

Desceased members
Princess Marie Louise (first wife of then-Prince Ferdinand I, died in 1899)
Clémentine, Princess August of Saxe-Coburg and Gotha-Koháry (mother of tsar Ferdinand I, died in 1907)
Tsaritsa Eleonore (second wife of tsar Ferdinand I, died in 1917)
Tsar Boris III (eldest son of tsar Ferdinand I, died in 1943)
Kiril, Prince of Preslav (youngest son of tsar Ferdinand I, died in 1945)
Tsar Ferdinand I (son of Prince August of Saxe-Coburg and Gotha-Koháry, died in 1948)
Duke Albrecht Eugen of Württemberg (husband of Princess Nadezhda, died in 1954)
Nadezhda, Duchess Albrecht Eugen of Württemberg (youngest daughter of tsar Ferdinand I, died in 1958)
Princess Eudoxia (eldest daughter of tsar Ferdinand I, died in 1985)
Antonio Rôxo de Ramos Bandeira (former husband of Duchess Sophie of Württemberg, daughter of Princess Nadezhda, died in 1987)
Prince Karl of Leiningen (former husband of Marie Louise, Princess of Koháry, died in 1990)
Tsaritsa Giovanna (widow of tsar Boris III, died in 2000)
Princess Alžbeta (widow of former tsar Ferdinand I, died in 2015)
Milena, Princess Boris of Leiningen (former wife of Prince Boris of Leiningen, son of Marie Louise, Princess of Koháry, died in 2015)
Margareta Luise, Viscountess of Chevigny (eldest daughter of Princess Nadezhda, died in 2017)
Duke Ferdinand Eugen of Württemberg (eldest son of Princess Nadezhda, died in 2020)
François Luce-Bailly, Viscount of Chevigny (widower of Duchess Margareta Luise of Württemberg, daughter of Princess Nadezhda, died in 2022)
Duke Eugen Eberhard of Württemberg (son of Princess Nadezhda, died in 2022)

Former members
 Duchess Alexandra of Württemberg (the Tsar's cousin-in-law, former wife of Duke Eugen Eberhard, son of Princess Nadezhda)

Tsardom of Bulgaria
The ruling members were:
 Ferdinand I (1887–1918)
 Boris III (1918–1943)
 Simeon II (1943–1946)

See also
List of Bulgarian monarchs

Notes

External links
 
 Official website of Simeon II of Bulgaria

Bulgarian royal houses
 
1887 establishments in Bulgaria